John Foxton Ross Kerr  (born 24 January 1934 in Sydney) is an Australian pathologist. He was the first to describe the ultrastructural changes in apoptosis, and could show that they differ significantly from the changes that occur in necrosis, another form of programmed cell death. For the first time, he placed the roles of cell death in normal adult mammals, and in disease, into scientific focus.

Biography

Education 
Kerr studied at the University of Queensland in Brisbane, Australia. In 1955, Kerr earned a Bachelor of Science (BSc) degree, and in 1957, a Bachelor of Medicine, Bachelor of Surgery (MBBS). As a medical assistant, he worked at the Royal Brisbane Hospital. In 1964, he earned a PhD at the University of London.

Academic career 

Starting in 1965, he taught pathology at the University of Queensland, and was made a professor in 1974. He became a professor emeritus in 1995.

Kerr, in collaboration with Andrew Wyllie and Alastair Currie, coined the term apoptosis to describe natural developmental cell death.

Awards and honours 
Kerr has received numerous awards and honours:
 1974–1992 – Fellow of the Royal College of Physicians
 1993 – Bancroft Medal of the Australian Medical Association
 1995 – Fred W. Stewart Award
 1996 – Officer of the Order of Australia
 1998 – Fellow of the Australian Academy of Science
 2000 – Paul Ehrlich and Ludwig Darmstaedter Prize
 2002 – Charles IV Prize of Charles University in Prague

Notes and references 
Bibliography
 
 

Notes

1934 births
Australian pathologists
Academics from Brisbane
Medical doctors from Brisbane
Medical doctors from Queensland
University of Queensland Mayne Medical School alumni
Fellows of the Australian Academy of Science
Living people
Officers of the Order of Australia
Scientists from Sydney
University of Queensland alumni
Academic staff of the University of Queensland